Bronson Koenig (born November 13, 1994) is an American professional basketball player who last played for the Erie BayHawks of the NBA G League. He played college basketball for the Wisconsin Badgers. Koenig attended Aquinas High School in La Crosse, Wisconsin.

High school career
Koenig attended Aquinas High School in La Crosse, Wisconsin. As a sophomore, Koenig averaged 17 points and 3 assists per game. He was named First Team All-State after leading Aquinas to the 2011 Division III State Championship. He missed much of his junior season due to an injury. In his senior campaign, he again led his team to a state title and was named 2013 Wisconsin Player of the Year by the Associated Press. Koenig scored 16 points in the title game. He averaged 17.0 points and 4.4 assists per game as a senior, shooting 45.5 percent from beyond the arc. Koenig was a McDonald's All American nominee.

College career

Koenig was moved into the Badgers starting lineup during the 2014–15 season after an injury to point guard Traevon Jackson on January 11, 2015. He averaged 11.6 points per game as a starting guard.

In the second round of the 2016 NCAA basketball tournament against the Xavier Musketeers, Koenig made a game-tying three-pointer with 11.7 seconds left. Then, after a Xavier offensive foul, he made another three-pointer at the buzzer to give Wisconsin a 66-63 victory. Koenig finished the game with 20 points. After the win, he said, "I like to have the ball in my hands in those kinds of situations because I believe in myself."

Koenig set the school record for career three point shots made on February 23, 2017 in a loss at Ohio State, passing former record-holder Ben Brust. Koenig averaged 14.5 points, 2.1 rebounds and 2.0 assists per game as a senior, shooting 39.3 percent from the 3-point arc. He finished his career with 1,459 points and 270 career 3-pointers.

College statistics

|-
| style="text-align:left;"| 2013–14
| style="text-align:left;"| Wisconsin
| 37 || 0 || 15.5 || .443 || .328 || .750 || 1.2 || 1.1 || 0.3 || 0.1 || 3.5
|-
| style="text-align:left;"| 2014–15
| style="text-align:left;"| Wisconsin
| 40 || 24 || 28.8 || .414 || .405 || .812 || 1.8 || 2.5 || 0.2 || 0.2 || 8.7
|-
| style="text-align:left;"| 2015–16
| style="text-align:left;"| Wisconsin
| 35 || 35 || 34.9 || .392 || .390 || .763 || 2.8 || 2.4 || 0.4 || 0.2 || 13.1
|-
| style="text-align:left;"| 2016–17
| style="text-align:left;"| Wisconsin
| 36 || 35 || 31.4 || .419 || .393 || .905 || 2.1 || 2.0 || 0.6 || 0.3 || 14.5
|-
| style="text-align:left;"| Career
| style="text-align:left;"| 
| 148 || 94 || 27.5 || .412 || .388 || .814 || 2.0 || 2.0 || 0.4 || 0.2 || 9.9

Professional career

Grand Rapids Drive (2017–2018)
After going undrafted in the 2017 NBA draft, Koenig signed a two-way contract with the Milwaukee Bucks on July 6, 2017. On September 21, 2017, the Bucks requested waivers on Koenig. A week later, he signed a training camp deal with the Chicago Bulls. He was waived on October 14 as one of the team's final preseason roster cuts. He would later participate with the Grand Rapids Drive for the 2017-18 NBA G League season. Koenig averaged 9.8 points per game and shot 40% from the three point arc in 47 games with Grand Rapids.

Mornar Bar (2018)
On August 10, 2018, Koenig signed with Mornar Bar. He left Mornar on November 29, 2018.

Basket Brescia Leonessa (2019)
On July 19, 2019, Koenig was reported to have signed with Basket Brescia Leonessa of the Italian Lega Basket Serie A (LBA). On September 24, 2019, due to long time injury, Basket Brescia Leonessa decided to release him.

Erie BayHawks (2019–2020)
On November 29, 2019, the Erie BayHawks announced that they had traded the returning right of Taylor Braun to the Grand Rapids Drive for the returning right of Koenig. Koenig missed a game in January 2020 with an undisclosed injury. On February 11, he recorded 15 points, three rebounds and one assist in a loss to the Capital City Go-Go. He averaged 5.3 points per game.

Personal life
Koenig is the son of Paul Koenig and Ethel Funmaker. He is a member of the Ho-Chunk Nation. He is opposed to using Native names as mascots, and was particularly against the Washington Redskins team name. In September 2016, Koenig and his brother drove a trailer packed with supplies 14 hours from Madison to the Standing Rock Indian Reservation, to join the protesters against the Dakota Access Pipeline. In December 2016, Koenig wrote a first-person article about the experience for The Players' Tribune entitled, "What I Found in Standing Rock."

References

1994 births
Living people
ABA League players
American expatriate basketball people in Montenegro
American men's basketball players
Aquinas High School (La Crosse, Wisconsin) alumni
Basketball players from Wisconsin
Erie BayHawks (2019–2021) players
Grand Rapids Drive players
Guards (basketball)
Ho-Chunk Nation of Wisconsin people
KK Mornar Bar players
Native American basketball players
Sportspeople from La Crosse, Wisconsin
Wisconsin Badgers men's basketball players
21st-century Native Americans